The following railroad companies operate in the U.S. state of Louisiana.

Common freight carriers
Acadiana Railway (AKDN)
Arkansas, Louisiana and Mississippi Railroad (ALM)
Baton Rouge Southern Railroad (BRS)
Bogalusa Bayou Railroad (BBAY)
BNSF Railway (BNSF)
Canadian National Railway (CN) through subsidiary Illinois Central Railroad (IC)
CG Railway (CGR)
CSX Transportation (CSXT)
Delta Southern Railroad (DSRR)
Geaux Geaux Railroad (GOGR)
Kansas City Southern Railway (KCS)
Louisiana and Delta Railroad (LDRR)
Louisiana and North West Railroad (LNW)
Louisiana Southern Railroad (LAS)
New Orleans and Gulf Coast Railway (NOGC)
New Orleans Public Belt Railroad (NOPB)
North Louisiana and Arkansas Railroad
Norfolk Southern Railway (NS) through subsidiary Alabama Great Southern Railroad (AGS)
Ouachita Railroad (OUCH)
Port Rail (Lake Charles) (PRLC) 
Timber Rock Railroad (TIBR)
Operates the Southern Gulf Railway
Union Pacific Railroad (UP)
Zee Railroad (ZEE)

Private freight carriers
East Camden and Highland Railroad
Laurel Valley & Rousseau Station Railroad (n.g. plantation railroad connecting Barker & Lepine properties along Bayou LaForche to one another[mainly cane fields to sugar mill] and to S.P. trunk line).

Passenger carriers
Amtrak (AMTK)
New Orleans Regional Transit Authority

Defunct railroads

Special notes: 
 Mileage not noted separately is retrieved from the Railroad Commission of Louisiana; Louisiana Railroad Mileage, 1920
 Other railroads and companies. 

New Orleans and Carrollton Railroad

References

Notes

General references
Association of American Railroads (2003), Railroad Service in Louisiana (PDF). Retrieved May 9, 2005.

I.C.C. Tap Line Case Logging Railroad Summaries. Texas Transportation Archive. Retrieved May 20, 2007.

Louisiana
Railroads